Bridgeport Hospital Milford Campus is a not-for-profit acute-care general medical, surgical and wound care community hospital located in Milford, Connecticut.

Facilities
Bridgeport Hospital Milford Campus has 106 beds, and offers inpatient and outpatient services and has specialties in emergency and walk-in services, joint replacement surgery, outpatient surgery, wound care, health education and home care services. The Connecticut Joint Center specializes in hip, knee and shoulder replacement surgery. Bridgeport Hospital Milford Campus is recognized by Blue Cross & Blue Shield as a Blue Distinction Center for expertise in delivering specialty care in orthopedic health. Bridgeport Hospital Milford Campus' outpatient Wound Care Center focuses on chronic and non-healing wounds which offers hyperbaric oxygen therapy(HBOT). 
                        
After delivering 90 years of childbirth care, the obstetrical services were ceased alongside closure of the Family Childbirth Center. This effectively led to a decline in maternity cases at Milford Hospital by 75 percent from 2010 to 2014, along with continued economic and regulatory challenges. The gynecological services are still operational at the hospital. 

In 2014, Yale New Haven Hospital formed a partnership with Milford Hospital to renovate and develop the hospital, thus forming a 24-bed inpatient Rehabilitation and Wellness Center which also has a rehabilitation gym. Yale closed the rehabilitation centers at both Bridgeport Hospital and Saint Raphael Hospital, moving their services to the new rehabilitation center located inside Milford Hospital.

Furthermore, a new unit opened in the hospital in July 2015 which specializes in neurological and orthopedic services. The intent of the collaboration is to enhance and improve the accessibility and to provide care in a way that benefits both organizations while preserving the independence of Milford Hospital.

In 2018, an announcement was made for the collaboration between Milford and Bridgeport Hospitals in which Milford Hospital would become a part of the Yale New Haven Health System (YNHHS).  This facility is now referred to as Bridgeport Hospital Milford Campus.

The main entrance is at 300 Seaside Avenue, Milford, Connecticut.

References

External links 

 Official website

Hospital buildings completed in 1920
Hospitals in Connecticut
Buildings and structures in Milford, Connecticut
1920 establishments in Connecticut